Lendi Vexer are a trip hop duo from Buenos Aires, Argentina. The two members of the band are Natalie Naveira and Diego Guiñazu, who uses the stage name DG.  They have both been making music since 1995 and formed the band in 2000.  They are accompanied by a guitarist and drummer when playing live.

Band lineup

 Natalie Naveira – Multi-instrumentalist, including guitar, violin, piano accordion and theremin; singer and songwriter
 DG – Plays sampler, Moog and bass; producer and songwriter

Discography

Suicidal adage EP (2004)

Track listing:
Tribute to desolation
'scape
Nothing was special
Suicidal adage.
Bonus Track with Natalie in Theremin.

The Process of Disillusion album (2007)

Track listing: 
11 de octubre
To play again
A boot doesn't ask, just trample
Courtesy excess
Simple cycle
A slow dripping in my brain
Looking for my time
Burdel
The Process Of Disillusion
Missing time
Suicidal adage (Spanish version)
That fish and the bait
La

Princess of Nothingness CD (2014)

Track listing: 
Desert
Luna de sal
Princess of Nothingness
Stormy clouds

Princess of Nothingness LIMITED EDITION on 7" VINYL (2014)

Track listing: 
Desert
Luna de sal
Princess of Nothingness
Stormy clouds
DOWNLOAD CARD: three rare versions.

Stormy Clouds Remixed EP (2016)
Track listing: 
Stormy Clouds (The Soulmate Project Remix)
Stormy Clouds (UBM Remix)
Stormy Clouds (DYREK Remix)

w.e.b. wicked electronic beats vol.1 Trip Hop Compilation (2005)

Edited by: Tripofagia.com (Trip Hop portal – off line)

Featured: "Tribute to desolation" by Lendi Vexer and other trip hop artists such as U-topia, Lovage (Mike Patton), etc.

References

External links 
 Official site 
 Stereotape Records, their record label

Argentine musical groups
Trip hop groups
Electronic music duos
Musical groups established in 2000